Les Charreaux is a small provincial village in the Dordogne region in France, administratively depending on the commune of Hautefort. The closest towns are Périgueux and Brive-la-Gaillarde.

The village's most notable feature is the large château, the Château des Charreaux.

Villages in Nouvelle-Aquitaine